Paulus Khofri, was an Assyrian composer, lyricist and painter.  He was born August 7, 1923 in  Baghdad, Iraq and died in Tehran, Iran in May 2000 at the age of 77.

Biography

Paulus Khofri's father, Jibrael Khofri, and his mother Victoria, were of Assyrian descent and originally from Iran.  They fled Iran during the Assyrian Genocide of World War I, migrating to Iraq, where they lived for many years. In 1928, the Khofri family returned to Iran and settled in Kermanshah in Western Iran.  Khofri grew up in Kermanshah and graduated from high school there.

Khofri's father was an accordion player who inspired his son to learn the instrument.  Khofri soon began to develop popular Assyrian music into a classical style; eventually, this led to the establishment of the Assyrian Music Ensemble, which performed many concerts for the Assyrian community in Kermanshah.

Khofri continued his musical studies in composition through correspondence courses from the United States and finally obtained a diploma in music composition and harmony from the United States School of Music, a correspondence school located in Port Washington, New York.  Khofri conducted the Saint Joseph Catholic Church Choir in Tehran for many years and also taught piano and music on the side while working for the Iranian Oil Company until his retirement.

Khofri is credited with composing numerous Assyrian folk songs in both Assyrian Neo-Aramaic and Persian.  An accomplished painter, along with these musical compositions, he often included landscapes of villages in Urmia done in black ink or water color.

In 1985, the Assyrian Foundation of America, in Berkeley, California, gave him an award in recognition of his work in Assyrian folk music.

Vocal music
Book # 1 Yoomani'd Eda Soora (Christmas Days) for piano and vocal (Illustrated), 1972
Book # 2 Zamrakh Am Ikhdadi (Sing Together) Tome 1 for piano and vocal (Illustrated), 1982
Book #3 Sheeta'd IsreI Arba Yakhi (24 Months a Year) two songs for every month of the year with illustrations, 1982
Book # 4 Zamrakh Mikhdadi (Sing together) Tome 2 classic folkloric song for 2, 3 and 4 voices, 1984
Book # 5 Galli'd Zoomari Tome 3 for piano and vocals (illustrated), 1988
Book # 6 Zmoor Blishanookh ( Sing in your Mother’s Language) for young singers, 1998
Book # 7 Songs of Praise Tome 1 for Organ and Vocals, 1988

Instrumental Music
Book # 1 Braghala'd Nemati Tome 2 No. 1 for piano, 1970
Book # 2 Braghala'd Nemati Tome 2 No. 2 for Piano, 1980
Book # 3 Assyrt Tome 1 classic folkloric music for piano, 1984
Book # 4 Nemati Mbazgha Tome 1 No. 1 for piano, 1987
Book # 5 Braghala'd Nemati Tome 2 No. 1 piano, violin, flute, guitar 1988. This book contains five parts: No. 1 Sonata in G minor for violin  and cello, dedicated to Maestro William Daniel, Assyrian composer and author; No. 2 Sonata in G Major for piano, composed in Zurich, Switzerland, dedicated to Issa Benyamin, the famous Assyrian calligrapher; No. 3 Fantasia in G minor for flute and guitar, dedicated to Mr. Simon Tomik, a classical guitarist; No. 4 Suite in D minor for violin, flute, guitar and piano, titled Braghala min Toora, dedicated to the Assyrian Highlanders; No. 5 Dipna'd Aina (Near the Spring) in D Major for flute, guitar and piano, composed for young girls in the villages bringing fresh cold water, in clay  jars for their fathers working in the wheat fields

Orchestral music
Book # 1 Assyrian Classic Folkloric Dance Compilation, May 1998
Book # 2 Epic of Gilgamesh, May 1998

Famous quotes
Whatever reaches one's ears, reflects all tides of life this nation has undergone in the past, present and will experience in the future. 
Music seeks to retain firmly that spirit, either sung by men and women praising God; or hummed by the farmer tilling his field. The joy of a young man whistling expecting to meet the girl he loves. The beating of the drum and the song of the fife in religious Shara (festivals). The blaring of the Brass instruments in anger, the wailing of the Oboe in sorrow, the intimate chatter of the string instruments all tell and paint vivid images of life in waves of sound. It is hoped, therefore, one can peep through this small window of music and see the revival of our past culture in budding.

See also
 Iraqi art
 Islamic art
 Islamic music
 Islamic poetry
 List of Iraqi artists
 Religious music in Iran

References
  (original domain is parked)

See also
William D. S. Daniel
Yosip Bet Yosip
List of Assyrians

1923 births
2000 deaths
20th-century composers
20th-century Iraqi painters
20th-century Iraqi male singers
Artists from Baghdad
Assyrian musicians
Writers from Baghdad
Syriac-language singers
Iranian composers
Iranian Eastern Catholics
Iranian Assyrian people
Iraqi Assyrian people
Iraqi emigrants to Iran
Musicians from Baghdad
Musicians  from Tehran